Uruthikol is a 2017 Tamil language action film written and directed by R Ayyanar, with Kishore and Meghana in the lead roles. The screenplay revolves around a school student dropped out from his school who finds his sister kidnapped by some  criminals and how he seeks to rescue her.

Plot 
A school student name Sasi is doing his higher studies in a higher secondary School. Suddenly he has fallen in love with Priyanka. After long, they got caught by their school teachers in their classroom. Finally their love story is revealed and the school principal has suspended Sasi from the school. After he dropped out from the school, the love between Sasi and Priyanka grew. One day Sasi took his sister, Yasodha, to the village temple festival with his family. Suddenly one bad guy teases Yasodha and he started fight with him and save her . After few years passed away another gang emerged and they doing some illegal activists such as chain snatching, rape crisis around the village. One day Sasi's lover and Yasodha is went to the village temple festival. On that occasion the members of the second gang are trying chain snatching and rape activity to his beloved ones. He appeared at that place and rescued both of them from the second gang.

After few days passed, Yasodha and Priyanka is by someone else. Sasi is trying to find them who done this to his beloved ones. On his first attempt he figured it out the second gang is a part of the  issue and fights with second gang and assaults them. He eventually figures out the bad guy who misbehaved with Yasodha on the village temple Festival. The fight between Sasi and bad guy came to be an end with a heavy cost. Sasi lost his leg during the fight and kills the bad guy. Finally he had rescued Yasodha and Priyanka from the bad guy and he is sent to jail for killing the bad guy.

Cast 
 Kishore DS as Sasi
 Meghana Ellen as Priyanka
 Kaali Venkat
 Kai Thenavvan
 Akilesh
 Kannan Ponnaiah
 Master Sivashankar

Production 
Kishore DS, known for his role as a child artist, was roped in to play the main lead.

Release 
The Times of India gave the film two and a half out of five stars and wrote that "Uruthikol could have been a decent action romance about a happy-go-lucky guy’s progression into a revenge-seeking youngster, like say a Naan Mahaan Alla. But the writing and execution are both amateurish that the film never holds our interest".

References 

2017 films
2010s Tamil-language films